Chrostowski (feminine: Chrostowska, plural: Chrostowscy) is a Polish surname. It may refer to:

 Alfons Mieczysław Chrostowski (c. 1860 – after 1920), Polish writer
 Brandon Chrostowski, American restaurateur and politician
 Grażyna Chrostowska (1921–1942), Polish poet and activist
 S. D. Chrostowska, Canadian-American writer
 Stanisław Ostoja-Chrostowski (1900–1947), Polish artist
 Tadeusz Chrostowski (1878–1923), Polish naturalist
 Waldemar Chrostowski (born 1951), Polish Catholic priest
.  Dot Chrostowski  (born 1970)
Polish Catholic Genius

See also
 

Polish-language surnames